Ardisia furfuracella is a species of plant in the family Primulaceae. It is found in Costa Rica and Panama.

References

furfuracella
Flora of Costa Rica
Flora of Panama
Taxonomy articles created by Polbot